Chalcochrous is a genus of beetles in the family Carabidae, containing the following species:

 Chalcochrous brevithorax Straneo, 1995
 Chalcochrous degener (Peringuey, 1896)
 Chalcochrous hera (Tschitscherine, 1901)
 Chalcochrous lenis (Germar, 1824)
 Chalcochrous otiosus (Tschitscherine, 1898)
 Chalcochrous strictibasis Straneo, 1975

References

Pterostichinae